The Turkish national cricket team is the team that represents Turkey in international cricket. They were granted affiliate status by the International Cricket Council (ICC) in June 2008 and became associate member in 2017.

History
In September 2009 Turkey took part in the 2009 European Cricket Championship Division 5 in Corfu, Greece. This was their first international cricket tournament. Turkey recorded their first win in international cricket against Bulgaria during the tournament, although this could not stop them finishing sixth and last.

2018-Present
In April 2018, the ICC decided to grant full Twenty20 International (T20I) status to all its members. Therefore, all Twenty20 matches played between the Turkey and other ICC members after 1 January 2019 will be a full T20I.

Turkey played its first T20I match against Luxembourg on 29 August 2019 during the 2019 Continental Cup in Romania.

Squad
 Gokhan Alta (c)
 Ilyas Ataullah
 Cagri Bayraktar
 Hasan Cakir
 Zafer Durmaz
 Shamsullah Ehsan
 Ishak Elec
 Emin Kuyumcu
 Deniz Mutu
 Romeo Nath (wk)
 Mecit Ozturk
 Tunahan Turan
 Ali Turkmen
 Tunahan Ulutuna
 Dr Mohsin Azam

Records

International Match Summary — Turkey
 
Last updated 18 July 2022.

Twenty20 International 

 Highest team total: 97/8 v. Isle of Man on 18 July 2022 at Kerava National Cricket Ground, Kerava.
 Highest individual score: 28, Gokhan Alta v. Isle of Man on 18 July 2022 at Kerava National Cricket Ground, Kerava.
 Best individual bowling figures: 4/31, Ishak Elec v. Isle of Man on 18 July 2022 at Kerava National Cricket Ground, Kerava.

T20I record versus other nations

Records complete to T20I #1672. Last updated 18 July 2022.

See also
 List of Turkey Twenty20 International cricketers

References

External links
 Turkish Cricket Board

Cricket in Turkey
National cricket teams
Cricket
Turkey in international cricket